Soyuz 28 (Union 28) was a March 1978 Soviet crewed mission to the orbiting Salyut 6 space station.  It was the fourth mission to the station, the third successful docking, and the second visit to the resident crew launched in Soyuz 26.

Cosmonaut Vladimír Remek from Czechoslovakia became the first person launched into space who was not a citizen of the United States or the Soviet Union. The other crew member was Aleksei Gubarev. The flight was the first mission in the Intercosmos program that gave Eastern Bloc and other communist states access to space through crewed and uncrewed launches.

Crew

Backup crew

Mission parameters
Mass: 
Perigee: 
Apogee: 
Inclination: 51.65°
Period: 88.95 minutes

Mission highlights

The Soyuz 28 mission was the first Intercosmos flight, whereby military pilots from Soviet bloc nations were flown on flights of about eight days to a Soviet space station. Pilots from other nations would eventually also fly. The program was a reaction to American plans to fly Western Europeans on Space Shuttle missions.

Vladimir Remek, the first non-Soviet, non-American to travel to space, was launched aboard Soyuz 28 on 2 March 1978, after a three-day delay of unspecified cause. The Soyuz commander was Soviet cosmonaut Aleksei Gubarev. The crew docked with the orbiting Salyut 6 space station, and greeted the occupants Georgi Grechko and Yuri Romanenko who had arrived on Soyuz 26 in December. Gubarev and Grechko had previously flown together on Soyuz 17 to the Salyut 4 space station in 1975.

The day after the docking, the Soyuz 26 crew celebrated their breaking of the space endurance record of 84 days, set by the Skylab 4 crew in 1974.

While the mission had a political purpose, scientific experiments were carried out, including one which monitored the growth of chlorella algae in zero gravity, another which used the on-board Splav furnace to melt glass, lead, silver, and copper chlorides, and an experiment called Oxymeter which measured oxygen in human tissue.

On 10 March, the Soyuz 28 crew prepared for their return to Earth, packing experiments and testing systems.

A joke appeared soon after the mission that Remek's hand had mysteriously turned red. He informed the doctors, the joke goes, that this was because every time he went to touch something, the Soviet crewmembers would slap his hand and yell, "Don't touch that!"

References

External links

Spaceflight mission report: Soyuz 28
Salyut 6 EP-2
Leaving Earth: Space Stations, Rival Superpowers, and the Quest for Interplanetary Travel

Crewed Soyuz missions
1978 in the Soviet Union
Czechoslovakia–Soviet Union relations
1978 in Czechoslovakia
Spacecraft launched in 1978
Spacecraft which reentered in 1978
March 1978 events
Spacecraft launched by Soyuz-U rockets